The women's 100 metres hurdles event at the 1986 Commonwealth Games was held on 31 July and 1 August at the Meadowbank Stadium in Edinburgh.

Medalists

Results

Heats
Qualification: First 3 of each heat (Q) and the next 2 fastest (q) qualified for the final.

Wind:Heat 1: +1.2 m/s, Heat 2: +2.3 m/s

Final
Wind: -1.1 m/s

References

Athletics at the 1986 Commonwealth Games
1986